Steenkamp is a surname. Notable people with the surname include:

De Kock Steenkamp (born 1987), South African rugby union player
Ewald Steenkamp (born 1988), Namibian cricketer
Gurthrö Steenkamp (born 1981), South African rugby union player
Jan-Benedict Steenkamp (born 1959), Dutch business scholar
Lenin Steenkamp (born 1969), South African footballer
Louren Steenkamp (born 1997), South African cricketer
Piet Steenkamp (1925–2016), Dutch politician
Reeva Steenkamp (1983–2013) South African model
Rosamund Everard-Steenkamp
Wilhelm Steenkamp (born 1985), South African rugby union player

See also
Steenkampsberg, Mpumalanga

Afrikaans-language surnames
Surnames of German origin